William Herbert, 2nd Marquess of Powis (c. 1660–1745) was a Welsh aristocrat and Jacobite supporter.

Life
He was the son of William Herbert, 1st Marquess of Powis, by Lady Elizabeth, younger daughter of Edward Somerset, 2nd Marquess of Worcester. Until 1722 he was known as Viscount Montgomery. At the coronation of James II, 23 April 1685, he acted as page of honour. From 8 May 1687 until November 1688 he was colonel of a regiment of foot, and was also deputy-lieutenant of six Welsh counties from 26 February to 23 December 1688.

After the Glorious Revolution, efforts on behalf of James II resulted in Montgomery's committal to the Tower of London on 6 May 1689  and he was not given bail until 7 November. On 5 July 1690, and again on 23 March 1696 a proclamation, accompanied by a reward of £1,000, was issued for his apprehension; on the latter occasion, he was suspected of complicity in the Jacobite assassination plot. In May 1696 he was outlawed, but a technical error on the part of the sheriffs of London enabled him to retain his estate. He surrendered on 15 December 1696 and was taken to Newgate Prison. Though he was reported to have given information concerning the plot, he remained there until 19 June 1697, when during an outbreak of gaol fever he was released on bail.

Montgomery was not tried, and in November 1700 was ill at Ghent. In January 1701 King William III allowed him to travel from Flanders in order to raise money on his estate and pay debts. He paid a second visit to London on 25 May 1703, surrendered himself, and was admitted to bail. Financial difficulties led him to sell his house in Lincoln's Inn Fields to the Duke of Newcastle in May 1705. He was living in Powis House in Great Ormond Street in 1708.

Arrested again during the Jacobite alarm in September 1715, Montgomery was considered harmless. He was eventually restored to his titles and estates, including Powis Castle, and was summoned to parliament as Marquess of Powis on 8 October 1722. By Jacobites, he was styled Duke of Powis, and he and his eldest son prepared a statement of their claim to that title; but the claim does not seem to have been pressed. He died on 22 October 1745.

Family

Montgomery married Mary, eldest daughter and coheiress of Sir Thomas Preston, bart., of Furness. She died on 8 January 1724 and was buried at Hendon, where the marquess had property. By her, Powis had two sons and four daughters. William, the eldest son, died unmarried on 8 March 1748. Edward, the younger son, died in 1734, having married Henrietta, daughter of James Waldegrave, 1st Earl Waldegrave, by whom he had an only child, Barbara, born posthumously. Barbara married a kinsman, Henry Arthur Herbert, who was created Baron Herbert of Cherbury in 1743, and Earl of Powis in 1748.

Notes

Attribution

1660 births

Year of birth uncertain
1745 deaths
Devonshire Regiment officers
William Herbert, 02nd Marquess of Powis
Dukes in the Jacobite peerage
2
Earls of Powis